Batang X is a 1995 Filipino film released under Regal Films. The film is about 5 children with superhuman abilities who get kidnapped by the alien Dr. Axis to help her steal sources of energy for her spaceship.

Cast
Aiko Melendez as Dr. Axis 
Michael de Mesa as Dr. Kwago
John Ace Zabarte as Angel "A-Gel" Arsenal/Batang-X #1  
JC Tizon as Bugoy/G:Boy/Batang-X #4
Anna Larrucea as Trina "3-Na" De La Paz/Batang-X #3 
John Prats as Kiko "KidLat" Arsenal/Batang-X #2
Janus del Prado as Control/Batang-X #5 
Alvin Froy Alemania as Freighten Kid
Chuck Perez as Zygrax
Jeofrey Eigenmann as Philips
Al Tantay as Dr. Dinero
Amy Perez as Mrs. Dinero
Troy Martino as Dr. Drago
Teresa Loyzaga as Trina's Mother 
Jaime Fabregas as Warlo 
Jon Achaval as Askal
Orestes Ojeda as Angel & Kiko's Father
Tess Dumpit as Angel & Kiko's Mother 
Mel Kimura as Lab Assistant

Franchise

Television
The movie's success generated a TV series Batang X sa TV on ABC 5, directed by Lore Reyes. The show was developed by MPB Primedia. It ran 45 minutes long per episode.

In 2008, another TV series was commissioned by Unitel Productions, Batang X: The Next Generation broadcast every Saturday on TV5 (formerly ABC 5). The show's special digital effects were executed by Optima, Inc. and Digitrax, Inc.

Comics
A comic book series of Batang X was published by Sonic Publishing and was sponsored,
as with the movie, by McDonald's.

References

External links

Batang X at International Catalogue of Superheroes

Philippine science fiction films
1990s science fiction films
1990s Tagalog-language films
1995 films
Regal Entertainment films
Filipino superheroes
Films directed by Peque Gallaga
Films directed by Lore Reyes